The Animal Shelf is a British 1997–2000 children's television series produced by Cosgrove Hall Films and based on the books written and illustrated by British writer Ivy Wallace about a group of talking toy animals who live in Timothy's bedroom. Aimed particularly at pre-school children, the Animal Shelf first aired on ITV running for 4 seasons and 52 episodes, running from 25 June 1997 to 3 August 2000.

Characters 
Timothy (voiced by Susan Sheridan in the United Kingdom and Marc Donato in the United States) is the Shelf Animals' young owner, who is never seen on-screen, just his shadow. The same goes for all other human characters in the show, apart from Mr Trigg the pet shop owner (who owns a chatty parrot and only appears in the episode Stripey to the Rescue, whose face is kept hidden from the picture.) 
Gumpa the Bear (voiced by Jimmy Hibbert in the UK and Chris Marren in the US) is the leader of the group who is quite bossy and lazy and enjoys sleeping in the sun.
Woeful the Monkey (voiced by Jimmy Hibbert in the UK and David Berni in the US) wears a red fez and coat. He often tells jokes, which are sometimes found rude by the other four. He enjoys getting his own way which can annoy the other Shelf Animals. 
Stripey the Zebra (voiced by Jimmy Hibbert in the United Kingdom and Jen Gould in the United States) is Getup's friend. He is thoughtful, kind and wise and has striped black and white wool. It is revealed in the first episode, Stripey To The Rescue, that he and Getup are Timothy's two oldest toy animals. In the United Kingdom version, he speaks with an Irish accent.
Getup the Giraffe (voiced by Susan Sheridan in the United Kingdom) is Stripey's special friend although she is still close friends with the others. She has brown curly hair on her long neck and speaks with a broad English accent. Getup often falls down (the material on her little hooves is badly worn and she often loses some stuffing through them) hence the name Getup. 
Little Mut is a tiny West Highland white terrier Dog (voiced by Susan Sheridan in the United Kingdom and Jill Frappier in the United States) who is close friends with Gumpa. He wears a pink bow on his back, and often ends up getting himself into difficult situations. He is very kind and caring towards the other Shelf Animals.
Mrs Mole and her Baby Moles are a family of moles who live underground. The moles only squeak instead of talking.
Kinker the Mouse caught his tail in mouse trap but managed to escape, so he is named after the kink it left in his tail. He is a great friend of the Shelf Animals and sometimes visits the blue shelf in Timothy's bedroom. Like Mrs Mole and her baby moles, he always squeaks instead of talking. In the first episode, Stripey To The Rescue, Getup meets Kinker at a travelling fairground, where the little mouse lives.
Jick the Jackdaw  – A wild jackdaw that takes up residence in the roof of the house near Timothy's garden. He likes shiny things and can be a nuisance by taking things from the Animals without them realising, but he can sometimes be really useful as well, particularly when the animals have to get high up to reach things like acorns and nuts. In the United States dub, Jick the Jackdaw is renamed as Carl the Crow.
Squirrel is the Shelf Animals' second best friend who lives in a tree in Bluebell Wood just outside Timothy's garden. He speaks in a weird language and often points to things like plants, although Getup and the Shelf crew understand him.
The Caterpillar – A red and yellow striped creature with eight pairs of legs who lives in Timothy's front garden near the moles' trapdoor. The caterpillar makes unusual sounds at times, but Stripey the Zebra and the gang understand what he means.
Roger – Timothy's best friend who is not at all shown on-screen.

Episode Guide

Every episode in The Animal Shelf series is 10 minutes long.

Series 1 (1997)
 1. Stripey to the Rescue – Stripey sets off to rescue Getup when, one dark night, she is kidnapped by a travelling funfair, where she meets Kinker, the squeaky Mouse. Meanwhile, Timothy, the animals' young and friendly owner, comes down with a cold and has to stay in bed, while Doctor tries to cure him. Meanwhile, Stripey himself nearly gets taken to a jumble sale by Mr Tompkins, thinking that he and Getup encourage germs.
 2. Gumpa and the Paint Box – Gumpa fakes illness by printing red spots all over himself, and pretending to have the measles.
 3. Getup Crusoe – When Getup loses all her brown spots after falling in Splashing Stream, the other animals' teasing drives her to set up a solitary home in Bluebell Wood.
 4. Kinker visits The Animal Shelf – Stripey and Getup rescue Kinker the squeaky mouse from Mr Trigg's pet shop. Kinker himself visits the five toy animals in their home.
 5. The Treasure Hunt – Getup and Stripey come across some buried treasure somewhere in Timothy's front garden, but Gumpa only finds some onions on the ground.
 6. Music in the Woods – Timothy wants his animals to help him find five different birds' feathers in Bluebell Wood from School's Nature Table, but Mr Trigg's parrot has other ideas – he wants the toy animals themselves to make their own music, using only some toy musical instruments that Timothy lends to them earlier on.
 7. The Animals' Garden – After the animals say "Sorry" to Timothy for accidentally pulling up his father's cabbage plants, thinking that they are "weeds", they make their own animal garden, along with Timothy's help. However, Stripey soon learns that plants need damp soil, a sunny outdoor place and plenty of clean, safe water to be able to grow properly.
 8. Woeful and the Waspberries – Woeful ventures into Bluebell Wood in search of some raspberries for Timothy's upcoming birthday.
 9. Gumpa Solves a Jigsaw Puzzle – One warm Spring day sees three of Timothy's animals, including Gumpa, attempt to solve a jigsaw puzzle out in Timothy's front garden. When Timothy is called in for tea, however, Woeful accidentally knocks over the almost-completed jigsaw puzzle, causing one of the jigsaw puzzle's pieces to fly into his bright red hat.
 10. Tidying Timothy's Bedroom – One day, Timothy's bedroom is in quite a mess, making the animals quite worried and Timothy's mother annoyed. While Timothy is out at School, however, Little Mutt and the gang try to clean up the room as an afternoon Surprise. Things go from bad to worse towards the end of the day when Woeful and Gumpa end up on board a lorry whilst looking for the key to Timothy's grandma's old wind-up music box.
 11. The Trail – The animals enjoy following a series of clues around Timothy's garden, in spite of Squirrel moving one of the clues away, thinking that it is an arrow made entirely out of acorns.
 12. The Model Monster – Inspired by Timothy's model ship, (made out of an eggs box and a cornflake packet) the animals make their own models from old bits and pieces. Gumpa builds himself an aeroplane which unfortunately falls to bits shortly before Take-Off, and in spite of a sudden brief Summer shower, Woeful makes himself (and ends up trapped inside) a robot-suit, which soon falls to bits as well.
 13. Little Mut Goes Flying – After an exhausting trip to the playground at Timothy's School, the five toy animals decide to build their own seesaw in their garden. However, despite the see-saw sending Little Mut himself flying through Bluebell Wood and into the Moles' house, all Woeful wants to play on is a swing, as it moves backwards and forwards whilst a rider is on board. Meanwhile, Timothy enjoys himself playing various different kinds of things in another house with his friend, Roger.
 14. Babysitting For Mrs Mole – Timothy has a long School day ahead of him, so the five special toy animals try their absolute hardest to look after Mrs Mole's babies, all while Mrs Mole herself visits her sick sister far away.

Series 2 (1998)
 1. Timothy's Pet Balloon – Despite Timothy winning a large model rabbit made out of blue balloons at Roger's party, the animals are forced to stay one night in a rather disgusting hutch in Timothy's garden, which is ordered in the post by Mr Tompkins.
 2. The Great Explorers – The animals decide to make their own maps in order to become great explorers. Chaos ensues when Mr Trigg's parrot flies into Timothy's bedroom.
 3. The Alarm Clock – Timothy has trouble getting out of bed in time for school in the mornings, so his mother decides to have an alarm clock on Timothy's dresser, which unfortunately goes off in the middle of the night, waking up all five animals in the process, including Little Mut.
 4. The Wolf in the Wood – The five toy animals have fantastic fun in Timothy's front garden, building three different houses to live in, but they also have a difficult time dealing with Woeful, who confidently plays the role of the big bad wolf.
 5. Woeful Flies to the Moon – Woeful uses an old litter bin to take Getup and the other four animals to Bluebell Wood for a rather exciting moon walk.
 6. Captain Gumpa – Gumpa acts as a Ship's Captain when he becomes the oldest one out of the five Special animals.
 7. The Hottest Day Of The Year – On a hot Summer's day, Timothy suggests that the five toy animals think of the best possible way to keep cool, all while his mother takes him to a swimming pool to cool off.
 8. The Mystery Of The Pictures – The shelf crew are puzzled about what they see in their bedroom when, one very hard morning, they borrow Timothy's Polaroid camera (after politely asking him first if they can do so).
 9. Timothy's Guest – The remarkable animal group feel put out when Timothy's cousin has to take his dog to stay at Timothy's house for the weekend.
 10. Little Mut Finds an Egg – As Timothy goes off to play Golf for the day, Little Mut and the other four animals try to find some eggs near Bluebell Wood.
 11. Kinker's Camping Holiday – Kinker the mouse's camping holiday goes completely haywire when one freezing cold night, his tent that Stripey and Getup build gets blown over to the other side of Splashing Stream, where (earlier on) he tells Getup and Stripey in squeaks he wants to camp.
 12. Timothy's Homework – Everyone from the blue Shelf helps Timothy when he suddenly gets behind with his homework for School.

Series 3 (1999)
 1. The First Snowflake – The approach of Winter fills the special animals with excitement, and they decide to hold a snowman-building competition – in Timothy's front garden.
 2. Getup the Skater – The five endearing toy animals get a surprise when they all wake up to a Winter Wonderland in Timothy's bedroom.
 3. Waiting For Santa Claus – The five toy animals are busy rushing around Timothy's house on Christmas Eve.
 4. A Very Special Day – Santa Claus has been and gone for another year and the festivities begin on the animal shelf, but why is Woeful so sad about it all?
 5. Living in the Jungle – Timothy explains to his five special friends about some animals that live in the jungle.
 6. Little Mut's Long Rest – The five toy animals themselves are blown about on their blue shelf one windy morning as Autumn approaches. Can Mrs Mole rescue all her baby moles before it's too late?
 7. Woeful and the Tooth Fairy – The remarkable animals learn the importance of keeping clean and tidy, while Timothy, the animals' young owner, awaits the arrival of the tooth fairy.
 8. The Art Gallery – Timothy's painting inspires his five animal friends from the shelf to go off somewhere and paint some pictures.
 9. The Lazy Afternoon – A beautiful sunny Summer afternoon finds all five of Timothy's special animals restless and keen to find something fun to do. However, Timothy enjoys himself playing in his front garden, using his roller skates that he finds earlier on in his wardrobe in his bedroom.
 10. Woeful's Magic Wand – Woeful's eagerness to master real magic gets him into trouble, all while a strange object appears in Timothy's bedroom.
 11. Buckets and Spades – Timothy and his parents are preparing to go away on holiday, and the five toy animals are worried that for weeks on end, there will be nobody in Timothy's house to look after them. However, Gumpa has an extraordinary plan, regardless of Stripey and Getup taking a nice, quiet walk to Mr Trigg's pet shop, where the parrot lives.
 12. The Jam Factory – With Timothy starting another School year, the special animals decide to make some jam, leaving Getup and Stripey up to their own eyes in fruit.
 13. Gumpa Reads A Story – Timothy is distracted by an interesting book, so Gumpa the Bear takes charge of entertaining his four friends.

Series 4 (2000)
 1. Animal Watch – Woeful and the other animals learn about animals that live in a desert, including a camel, along with Timothy's guidance.
 2. Timothy's Valentine's Cards – The five toy animals learn all about Saint Valentine's Day (the most romantic day of the year) with some help from their young owner, Timothy.
 3. Gumpa's Halloween Lantern – The shelf residents are in for some seriously scary Halloween-themed fun in Timothy's house.
 4. The Easter Egg Hunt – Timothy's mother sets up a bumper Easter Egg Hunt, so Timothy himself lets his five toy animals help him as the Easter eggs themselves are all hidden high and low, particularly around the front garden.
 5. Gumpa's Ark – Gumpa has an extraordinary plan to save his four animal friends from a flood, including clumsy Getup.
 6. The Garden Sale – The five animals find out about money as a new animal arrives on their shelf in Timothy's bedroom.
 7. Looking for Big Mut – When Timothy draws his family tree, the animals themselves decide to find ancestors of their own, and Little Mut goes in search of the elusive Big Mut.
 8. A Night In A Tent – A camping adventure for Timothy inspires his special and endearing animal friends to spend the night in a tent. Getup and Stripey's fun in the woods leads to a very narrow escape, and the baby moles have some extraordinary plans in store for Little Mutt.
 9. The King of the Castle – Timothy's book of the "round table" and a magnificent castle inspire the special animals to have a medieval adventure with dragons, evil knights and a magic sword.
 10. Timothy's Racing Car – A remote-controlled racing car arrives for Timothy, and the special animals all decide to leave their shelf before tracking it down.
 11. The Shooting Star – Timothy is given a map of the stars in the night sky and lets his five animals into a secret.
 12. Get Down – Gumpa prepares the animals for an obstacle race around Timothy's front garden, but, where is Getup?
 13. Gumpa's Head – Timothy begins a keep fit regime, but poor Gumpa just needs to take things easy.

International Broadcast
The series has also aired around the world including the ABC in Australia, KTV2 in Kuwait, RTÉ2 in Ireland as part of their children's block The Den, Dubai 33 in the United Arab Emirates, the children's television network K-T.V. World and M-Net (as part of their series of children's lineup blocks K-T.V.) in South Africa, Premiere 12 (as part of their children's block Kidz Blitz), Eureka Learning Channel and Kids Central in Singapore, PBS and Television Malta in Malta, TVB Pearl in Hong Kong, SVT and SVT Barnkanalen in Sweden and TVNZ 2 and TVNZ 6 in New Zealand as part of their children's block Kidzone.

It's Itsy Bitsy Time
The series was also seen on an American children's wrapper programme called It's Itsy Bitsy Time along with several TV series from overseas and aired on the Fox Family Channel in America and Treehouse TV in Canada in 1999 with the British voices being redubbed with American and Canadian voices. The voices were directed by Canadian voice actress Susan Roman who is best known for voicing Sailor Jupiter in the dubbed anime Sailor Moon. Roman also directed the American and Canadian voices for another British children's animated television series seen on It's Itsy Bitsy Time, Tom and Vicky.

Merchandise
The series later had tie in story books from Ladybird Books, and a quintet of VHS tapes from Disney Videos between 1997 and 2001.

References

External links

ITV children's television shows
1997 British television series debuts
2000 British television series endings
1990s British children's television series
2000s British children's television series
British television shows based on children's books
British picture books
British children's animated adventure television series
Australian Broadcasting Corporation original programming
Fox Family Channel original programming
Treehouse TV original programming
TVNZ 2 original programming
British stop-motion animated television series
Television series by ITV Studios
Television shows produced by Anglia Television
English-language television shows
Sentient toys in fiction
Fiction about toys
1990s British animated television series
2000s British animated television series
Television series by Cosgrove Hall Films
Animated television series about bears
Animated television series about birds
Animated television series about dogs
Animated television series about mice and rats
Animated television series about monkeys
Animated television series about squirrels